Downey is an Irish surname that means in English “belonging to a fort”. The name is found from ancient times in areas of Ireland's modern County Galway, southwest Cork, Kerry, Limerick, Ulster and Leinster and is believed to be the surname of three distinct families. In Ulster, Downey (I. Ó Duibheanaigh) were the chiefs of the Ulaid petty-kingdom of Cinel Amhalgaidh, now known in the Anglicised form as Clanawley in County Down, Northern Ireland.

Notable people
Aaron Downey (born 1974), NHL forward
Alexander Downey (1817–1898), Justice of the Indiana Supreme Court
Brian Downey (drummer) (born 1951), Irish drummer
Brian Downey (actor) (born 1944), Canadian actor
Bruce Downey, CEO of Barr Pharmaceuticals
Edmund Downey (1856–1937), Irish journalist and novelist
Glen Downey (writer), Canadian children's author
James Downey (academic)
James Downey (Internet performance artist)
James Erwin Downey (born 1942), Canadian politician 
Jim Downey (comedian)
John G. Downey (1827–1894), Californian patriot
John T. Downey, CIA agent and P.O.W.
Juan Downey (1940–1993), Chilean video artist
June Downey (1875–1932), American psychologist
Keith Downey (agricultural scientist), Canadian agricultural scientist
Keith Downey (politician), Minnesota politician
Marg Downey (born 1961), Australian comedian
Margaret Downey, American atheist activist
Morton Downey (1901–1985), American singer nicknamed "The Irish Nightingale"
Morton Downey Jr. (1932–2001), American singer, songwriter and television talk show host of The Morton Downey Jr. Show
Patrick Downey (disambiguation), multiple people
Robert Downey (hurler) (born 1999)
Robert Downey Sr. (1936–2021), originally Robert Elias Jr., actor, writer and film director
Robert Downey Jr. (born 1965), American actor 
Rod Downey, author
Roma Downey (born 1960), Irish actress and producer
Shannon Downey, American crafter and activist
Shem Downey (1922–2013), Irish hurler
Sheridan Downey (1884–1961), lawyer and Democratic U.S. Senator from California 
W. & D. Downey (William and Daniel), photographers

U.S. Navy and Army

The source for all material in this section is the Gannet Military Times Hall of Valor website.

Medal of Honor
William Downey (U.S. Civil War hero), a Union Army cavalryman, was awarded the Medal of Honor for braving heavy fire from a Confederate States Army artillery battery as a volunteer member of a boat crew on the Ashepoo River, South Carolina to rescue crewmen on the stranded Union (American Civil War) steamer Boston.

Navy Cross recipients
Ernest Willard Downey for heroism in combat against the enemy in directing and operating anti-aircraft fire from his vessel while exposed to frequent horizontal Imperial Japanese aerial attacks and dive bombings, during the period of World War II from 7 December 1941 to 25 February 1942 and while on board the U.S.S. VAGA (YT-116)

Soldier's Medal recipients
Arlie L. Downey, on 10 July 1926 upon learning that an injured woman was lying exposed in the road near a point where the two heaviest explosions of the explosions at the Lake Denmark Naval Ammunition Depot (aka Lake Denmark Powder Depot) near Dover, New Jersey, had already occurred and accompanied by two other men, proceeded toward that point and rescued the woman through the continuous roar of exploding magazines and when the air was filled with flying shells, stones, and fragments of buildings, and shortly before a third heavy explosion of the facility's munitions occurred.

Distinguished Service Cross (United States) recipients
Ernest L. Downey, during World War I near the Bois-de-Montrebeau, France, 28 September 1918, while severely wounded refused to go to the rear, but continued in the advance until the final objective was reached and his company relieved

Distinguished Flying Cross (United States) recipients
Joseph Downey, U.S. Marine Corps, Pacific Theater of World War II
John E. Downey, U.S. Marine Corps, Pacific Theater of World War II
Thomas A. Muldowney, U.S. Marine Corps, Pacific Theater of World War II
Lawrence E. Downey, U.S. Army Air Forces, European theater of World War II

Durbin H. Downey, U.S. Army Air Forces, World War II, Korean conflict, Cold War

See also 
Downie, a related surname, chiefly Scottish

References

Anglicised Irish-language surnames
Irish royal families
Surnames of Irish origin